Laguna Brava (Spanish for wild or rough lake), also known as Yolnabaj is a karstic lake in Guatemala. It is situated in the municipality of Nentón (Huehuetenango), close to the border with Mexico. The lake is fed by several streams and subterraneous watercourses.

The area around Laguna Brava has been inhabited by Mayan communities of the Chuj ethnicity since the 19th century. In the year 2000 a conflict over land usage emerged between indigenous communities depending on the land, and the American owners that just acquired it in order to transform it into a nature reserve.

References

External links
 Prensa Libre article on the Laguna Brava and the land conflict between new US owners and local Mayan communities
 Friends of Laguna Brava

Brava
Geography of the Huehuetenango Department